Jack Be Nimble is a 1993 New Zealand gothic horror movie directed by Garth Maxwell, who later described it as "a stylised supernatural tale". The film stars the American Alexis Arquette and the New Zealand actor Sarah Smuts-Kennedy. It includes one of the final movie appearances of the legendary British/New Zealand actor and musician Bruno Lawrence.

Plot
Jack (Arquette) decides to put an end to the abuse he has received from his adoptive parents, and runs away to find his long lost sister, Dora (Smuts-Kennedy). Although Dora has fared much better since their abandonment and subsequent adoption, she is also drawn to use her telepathic powers to find him. Along the way, Jack is constantly pursued by the four daughters of his adoptive parents, seeking revenge for their parents' demise at the hands of Jack and his invention.

DVD release
Used copies of the film can often be found on DVD selling for multiple times their original price, due to its rarity and cult status.

Critical reception
The film has received many positive reviews. Stephen Holden of The New York Times wrote that "the film cuts back and forth between scenes of their childhood and adolescence, it evokes their misery and isolation with a feverish intensity that recalls scenes from Hitchcock and De Palma". Dominic Corry of the New Zealand Herald described the film as "one of the strangest New Zealand films ever made" and thought that it "deserves way more of a cult reputation than it currently enjoys". Kim Newman of Empire Online said that Jack be Nimble was, "Not a film likely to please everyone, but strong stuff nonetheless".

References

External links
 
 
 Jack Be Nimble at NZ On Screen
 Jack Be Nimble at Empire Online

1993 films
New Zealand horror films
1993 horror films
Films scored by Chris Neal (songwriter)
1990s New Zealand films
1990s English-language films